José Maria, usually the Portuguese equivalent of the Spanish given name José María, may refer to:
 José Maria Alkmin (1901–1974), Vice-President of Brazil from 1964 to 1967
 José Maria de Eça de Queirós (1845–1900), Portuguese writer
 José Maria de Santo Agostinho (died 1912), Brazilian religious leader born Miguel Boaventura Lucena
 José Maria Marin (born 1932),  Brazilian politician and former sports administrator who was the President of the Brazilian Football Confederation
 José Maria Rodrigues Alves (born 1949), footballer, 1970 FIFA World Cup champion, known as "Zé Maria"
 José Marcelo Ferreira (born 1973), footballer, bronze medal at the 1996 Summer Olympics, known as "Zé Maria"
 José Maria de Almeida (born 1957), political activist, leader of the PSTU, known as "Zé Maria"

See also
 José María
 Zé María